Guadalupe is a town located in the northern part of São Tomé Island, which is part of the island nation of São Tomé and Príncipe. It is the seat of Lobata District. Its population is 7,604 (2012 census). Guadalupe lies 1.5 km northwest of Agostinho Neto, 10 km east of Neves and 11 km northwest of the capital São Tomé.

Population history

Notable people
William Barbosa, footballer
Olinda Beja, writer

References

Populated places in Lobata District